Alderson Broaddus University (AB) is a private Baptist university in Philippi, West Virginia. It is affiliated with the American Baptist Churches USA. It was formed in 1932 as Alderson–Broaddus College by the union of two Baptist institutions: Alderson Academy (founded 1901) and Broaddus Institute (founded 1871; moved to Philippi, 1909). The school adopted its current name in 2013.

The university's academics are organized into five academic divisions: Education and Special Programs, Health Sciences, Humanities, Natural Sciences and Social Sciences. It was the first college in West Virginia to offer a four-year degree in nursing and the first in the country to offer a four-year physician assistant degree.

History

Alderson Broaddus University derives its name from the merging of two Baptist institutions in 1932. The older of the two, Broaddus Institute, was founded in Winchester, Virginia, in 1871 by Edward Jefferson Willis, a Baptist minister who named the new school after Rev. William Francis Ferguson Broaddus, a prominent Baptist minister at the time of the American Civil War. In response to economic hard times, Broaddus Institute was moved across the Allegheny Mountains to Clarksburg, West Virginia, in 1876. The college was moved again to the small town of Philippi in 1909. In 1917 it became Broaddus College and Academy.

The other institution, Alderson Academy, was founded in Alderson, West Virginia, in 1901 by Emma C. Alderson, a committed Baptist laywoman. Designed as a home school, it provided academic work in classics, sciences and normal studies. Originally supported by the Greenbrier Baptist Church, control was assumed by the West Virginia Baptist Association in 1910.

As the years passed, Broaddus became a junior college, then a senior college—first granting baccalaureate degrees in 1926—and Alderson Academy also added junior college status. Financial hardship in the late 1920s led to a decision to merge the two colleges, which shared common missions and outlooks as Baptist and liberal arts institutions; the merged institution, Alderson Broaddus College, opened its doors in 1932. Since its founding, Alderson Broaddus has been committed to a strong liberal arts education that seeks to imbue students with an appreciation of literature and the arts, Christian faith, music, and the sciences. In more recent times, the college has focused on developing programs in the natural and applied sciences as well. In 1945, Alderson Broaddus developed the first four-year nursing and the first radiologic technology programs in West Virginia.

A portion of the physical assets of Storer College, a Black Baptist college founded in 1865 in Harpers Ferry, were transferred to Alderson Broaddus in 1964 and used to fund the “Storer Scholarship” given annually to an African-American students..

In 1968, the college pioneered the nation's first four-year physician assistant (PA) program, an innovation that has had significant influence on the development of the PA profession nationwide. From this program emerged in 1991 the college's first graduate degree offering, the Physician Assistant Master's program.

In 2011, the college chose Richard Creehan as president. Creehan embarked on a plan to expand the college and the institution has since increased enrollment by over 600 students, expanded the athletic department, and added many new academic programs. In 2013, the college's Board of Governors renamed the institution Alderson Broaddus University. That same year, the institution matriculated the largest incoming freshman class in school history.

In June 2017, the Higher Learning Commission put the University on probation because it determined that the institution was at risk due to financial difficulties. In 2019, it was no longer on probation, due to improved financial performance.

Campus

The university is located on a  campus with approximately 1100 students. The campus occupies a rolling hilltop overlooking the Tygart Valley River and the community of Philippi, with its county courthouse, church spires and the historic Philippi Covered Bridge, used by both Confederate and Union troops during the first land battle of the Civil War. The campus includes seven residence halls, the old Broaddus Hospital, a student center and cafeteria, an arena that houses the basketball, swimming, wrestling, and acrobatics and tumbling programs, tennis courts, a grass field used for intramural sports, a state of the art stadium that houses the football, lacrosse, and soccer teams, six academic buildings, a library, and a chapel.

The oldest extant building on the campus, Whitescarver Hall (circa 1911), was named for George M. Whitescarver of Pruntytown, WV. The Classical Revival building was designed by the architectural firm of Holmboe and Lafferty and was placed on the National Register of Historic Places in 1990.

Student life
AB is home to a big Greek community, with three local fraternities (Sigma Delta Nu, Epsilon Tau Eta Sigma, and Lambda Omega Mu), three local sororities (Lambda Sigma Phi, Phi Kappa Delta, and Zeta Eta Theta), one national sorority (Sigma Alpha Iota), and one national fraternity (Kappa Alpha Psi).

Residence life
The campus has seven different dorms for students to live in. All housing options are co-ed.
The seven dorms are: Priestley Hall, Benedum Hall, Kincaid Hall, Battler Hall, and Blue, Gold and University (BGU) Halls. Kincaid, Priestley, Blue and Gold Halls are suite style residence halls, complete with bedrooms, bathrooms, and shared living space. Some of these suites have kitchens. Benedum is a true dorm with community bathrooms. Battler and University rooms are two dorm rooms connected by a bathroom. All dorms have a Residence Director and several Residence Assistants.

Athletics 
Known as the "Battlers" (harkening back to the 1861 Battle of Philippi), Alderson Broaddus is a member of the Mountain East Conference (MEC) and NCAA Division II. The team's colors are Navy Blue, Gray and Gold, and its mascot is named Skirmish. The university offers 24 sports, 22 at the Varsity level: Football (which became a full varsity program in 2013), Baseball, Softball, Men's and Women's Basketball, Men's and Women's Soccer, Men's and Women's Lacrosse, Men's (club level; to become full varsity in 2015–16) and Women's Volleyball, Men's and Women's Cross Country, Men's and Women's Track, Men and Women's Golf, Men and Women's Rugby, Men and Women's Swimming, Men's Wrestling, Men's Sprint Football, Women's Acrobatics and Tumbling, Women's Tennis and Cheerleading.

AB and its predecessor institutions had been members of the West Virginia Intercollegiate Athletic Conference (WVIAC) since that league's formation in 1924. The WVIAC disbanded at the end of the 2012–13 school year, after the nine WVIAC members that then played football announced they would break away to form a new league that eventually became the Mountain East Conference.

Shortly after the announcement of the Mountain East split, AB found a new conference home, accepting an invitation to join the G-MAC in the fall of 2013. AB and three other West Virginia schools—former WVIAC members Davis & Elkins and Ohio Valley, plus independent Salem International—all entered the G-MAC.

In 2012 AB started its football program, initially competing at the club level before moving up to Division 2 the following year. Alderson Broaddus originally competed as an independent football team without a conference. In 2016 the G-MAC conference decided to partially make football a competitive sport in the conference with the full competition to start in 2017.The Battlers first defeated Kentucky Wesleyan in the Founders Cup in 2015 to become the first ever G-MAC football Champion. The Battlers became the first G-MAC Conference football champions on 11/12/16 when they defeated Kentucky Wesleyan University 31–28. The G-MAC added another new team to the conference in 2017 of Malone University.

Alderson-Broaddus Baseball won the G-MAC conference title for the first time on May 14, 2016, over Trevecca Nazarene 9–6.

On June 9, 2020, Alderson Broaddus announced that they're leaving the Great Midwest Athletic Conference and will join the Mountain East Conference.

Notable alumni 
 Denise Campbell, politician and a Democratic member of the West Virginia House of Delegates
 Fred Chenoweth, former American football coach
 Theodore S. Coberly, former air force brigadier general who was director of reconnaissance and electronic warfare and deputy chief of staff
 Randy Dobnak, Major League pitcher for the Minnesota Twins
 Josh Gabriel, Grenadian international footballer
 Barrington Gaynor, former professional soccer coach
 Bob Gray, former men's soccer coach at Marshall University
 Hunter Hardman, former college football coach
 Ernie Nestor, college basketball coach
 Donovan Olumba, NFL player
 John O'Neal, politician and a Republican member of the West Virginia House of Delegates
 Kirk Pearson, former professional soccer player
 Enrico del Rosario, professional soccer player
 Ed Schrock, U.S. Congressman (R., VA), 2001–2005
 Gil Vainshtein (born 1984), Canadian former professional soccer player
 Jimmy Williams, professional basketball player
 Steve Willis, Baptist pastor and national health activist
 Richard F. Wilson, President, Illinois Wesleyan University
 Maj. Gen. Jessica L. Wright, first woman Adjutant General of the Pennsylvania National Guard; second woman to hold such a position in the USA

References

External links 
Official website
Official athletics website

 
Universities and colleges affiliated with the American Baptist Churches USA
Baptist Christianity in West Virginia
Education in Barbour County, West Virginia
Educational institutions established in 1871
Buildings and structures in Barbour County, West Virginia
Tourist attractions in Barbour County, West Virginia
1871 establishments in West Virginia
Universities and colleges formed by merger in the United States
Private universities and colleges in West Virginia